Cerium(III) bromide is an inorganic compound with the formula CeBr3. This white hygroscopic solid is of interest as a component of scintillation counters.

Preparation and basic properties
The compound has been known since at least 1899, when Muthman and Stützel reported its preparation from cerium sulfide and gaseous HBr. Aqueous solutions of CeBr3 can be prepared from the reaction of Ce2(CO3)3·H2O with HBr. The product, CeBr3·H2O can be dehydrated by heating with NH4Br followed by sublimation of residual NH4Br. CeBr3 can be distilled at reduced pressure (~ 0.1 Pa) in a quartz ampoule at 875-880 °C.
Like the related salt CeCl3, the bromide absorbs water on exposure to moist air. The compound melts congruently at 722 °C, and well ordered single crystals may be produced using standard crystal growth methods like Bridgman or Czochralski.

CeBr3 adopts the hexagonal, UCl3-type crystal structure with the P63/m space group. The cerium ions are 9-coordinate and adopt a tricapped trigonal prismatic geometry. The cerium–bromine bond lengths are 3.11 Å and 3.16 Å.

Applications
CeBr3-doped lanthanum bromide single crystals are known to exhibit superior scintillation properties for applications in the security, medical imaging, and geophysics detectors.

Undoped single crystals of CeBr3 have shown promise as a γ-ray scintillation detector in nuclear non-proliferation testing, medical imaging, environmental remediation, and oil exploration.

Suppliers
Sigma-Aldrich

References

Cerium(III) compounds
Bromides
Lanthanide halides